Bombycina is the name for a subsection of Ditrysian insects in order containing both butterflies and moths having a dorsal heart vessel. Subsection Bombycina contains generally larger sized moths and butterflies in the superfamilies Bombycoidea, Calliduloidea, Cimelioidea, Drepanoidea, Geometroidea, Noctuoidea, and Papilionoidea, having spineless pupae.

See also
 Taxonomy of Lepidoptera

References 

Ditrysia